CBRN School and Training Center Command was established in Ankara in 1930 under the name as Gas Inspection. In 1937, it was named as Genera Gas Command. Chemistry class was established in 1957. In 1962, it moved to Çankırı under the name of Nuclear Biology and Chemistry School. In 2012, it moved to Konya under the name of CBRN School and Training Center Command. Headquarters is in Konya. The task of the troops is to train personnel who will perform the necessary reconnaissance, assessment and cleaning within the scope of the CBRN defense operations. It has a CBRN Defense Battalion Command that can intervene against attacks.

See also 

 Turkish Army
 CBRN defense

References 

Konya
Military education and training in Turkey
Turkish Land Forces
Chemical, biological, radiological and nuclear defense